Sant'Angelo del Pesco is a comune (municipality) in the Province of Isernia in the Italian region Molise, located about  northwest of Campobasso and about  north of Isernia.

References

External links 
 

Cities and towns in Molise